Chubukaran (Sıbıqaran) is a rural locality (a village) in Sharovsky Selsoviet, Belebeyevsky District, Bashkortostan, Russia. The population was 104 as of 2010.

Geography 
It is located 37 km from Belebey and 12 km from Sharovka.

References 

Rural localities in Belebeyevsky District